Facundo Lescano (born 18 August 1996) is an Argentine professional footballer who plays as a forward for Italian  club Pescara. He also holds Italian and French  citizenship.

Career
Lescano is a youth exponent from Torino. He made his Serie A debut on 10 January 2015 against Milan. He replaced Matteo Darmian after 81 minutes in a 1–1 draw.
After the experiences in Group C of the Lega Pro - Third Serie of italian football - on loan from Torino at Melfi before and Monopoli after during the 2015–16 season. Lescano in the September 2016 go to Igea Virtus Barcellona P.G. in Group I of Serie D and in his first match find also first goal with new team against Sarnese.

On 14 August 2018 Lescano joined Telstar in the Netherlands on a season-long loan from Parma, Telstar held a buyout option at the end of the term.

On 12 January 2019, Lescano joined on loan to Potenza.

On 2 August 2019, he returned to Sicula Leonzio on a permanent basis, signing a 2-year contract.

On 29 August 2020, he moved for the second time to Sambenedettese, signing a contract for the term of 3 years with an option for 4th.

On 10 June 2021, he joined Virtus Entella.

On 12 July 2022, Lescano moved to Pescara, with Luca Clemenza moving in the opposite direction as part of the transfer.

Career statistics

Honours

Club
Torino
 Campionato Primavera: 2014–15

References

External links
 

1996 births
Living people
People from Mercedes, Buenos Aires
Argentine people of Italian descent
Argentine footballers
Argentine expatriate footballers
Association football forwards
Serie A players
Serie C players
Serie D players
Genoa C.F.C. players
A.S. Martina Franca 1947 players
Torino F.C. players
A.S. Melfi players
S.S. Monopoli 1966 players
Parma Calcio 1913 players
A.C.N. Siena 1904 players
A.S.D. Sicula Leonzio players
Potenza Calcio players
A.S. Sambenedettese players
Virtus Entella players
Delfino Pescara 1936 players
Eerste Divisie players
SC Telstar players
Argentine expatriate sportspeople in the Netherlands
Expatriate footballers in the Netherlands
Sportspeople from Buenos Aires Province